Zagloba is a genus of scalehunter lady beetles in the family Coccinellidae. There are at least four described species in Zagloba.

Species
 Zagloba bicolor Casey, 1899
 Zagloba hystrix Casey, 1899
 Zagloba ornata (Horn, 1895)
 Zagloba satana Gordon, 1985

References

Further reading

 
 
 
 
 
 
 
 
 

Coccinellidae
Coccinellidae genera